The masked bowerbird (Sericulus aureus) is one of the most brilliantly coloured  bowerbirds. The male is a medium-sized bird, up to 25 cm long, with flame orange and golden yellow plumage, elongated neck plumes and yellow-tipped black tail. It builds an "avenue-type" bower with two side walls of sticks. The female is an olive brown bird with yellow or golden below.

The flame bowerbird is distributed in and endemic to rainforests of New Guinea. This species is the first bowerbird described by naturalists. Because of the male's beautifully coloured plumage, it was previously thought to be a bird-of-paradise. Indeed, the male flame bowerbird also has a courtship display along with his bower. He twists his tails and his wings to the side, and then shakes his head quickly.

The masked bowerbird is evaluated as least concern on the IUCN Red List of Threatened Species.

References

masked bowerbird
Birds of New Guinea
masked bowerbird
masked bowerbird